Trnovica may refer to several placenames:

In Bosnia and Herzegovina
Trnovica, Bileća, village in the municipality of Bileća
Trnovica, Kalinovik, village in the municipality of Kalinovik
Trnovica (Zvornik), village in the municipality of Zvornik

In Croatia
Trnovica, Dubrovnik-Neretva County, village in the municipality of Dubrovačko Primorje
Trnovica, Primorje-Gorski Kotar County, village in the municipality of Jelenje 

In Kosovo
Tërrnavicë, village near Podujevo

In Montenegro
Trnovica, Montenegro, village in the municipality of Kolašin

In Slovenia
Trnovica, Ivančna Gorica, a village in the municipality of Ivančna Gorica